Juliette Mole (born 1964) is an English actress and artist, now based in London. She is married to the actor Lloyd Owen.

Early life
She began her career with the Royal Shakespeare Company and later appeared on television and in film.

Career
Mole appeared as a singer in a West End production of Francis Beaumont's The Knight of the Burning Pestle at the Aldwych Theatre in 1981. The same year, she was understudy to Peggy Ashcroft as the Countess in Trevor Nunn's Royal Shakespeare Company production of All's Well That Ends Well, and had some lesser roles for the company.

In 1983, she played Bella in the Avon Touring Theatre Company's first production of Vince Foxall's Brittle Glory, a reworking of Richard II.

Mole's first credited screen role was in the first episode of the television drama The Fourth Arm (1983), in which she played a WAAF. She went on to appear in Screen Two, the Miss Marple film 4.50 from Paddington (1987), with Joan Hickson as Marple, in Agatha Christie's Poirot with David Suchet, Rumpole of the Bailey, and Absolutely Fabulous. In The Chief, she played Marie-Pierre Arnoux from 1993 to 1994.

Art
In the 1990s, she lived on a houseboat on the River Thames, where she was reported to keep collections of black and white photographs and hats. Her interest in art developed into a new career as an artist, and she now specializes in trompe-l'œil and garden design.

Personal life
Mole is married to the actor Lloyd Owen, and they have two children, Maxim and Mimi. In 2006, they were living in Battersea, London. In 2011, the family was reported to have left London and to be staying in Los Angeles, California.

Filmography
The Fourth Arm (1983) – WAAF
Screen Two (episode Honest, Decent and True, 1986) – Davina Fraser
4.50 from Paddington (1987) – Anna Stravinska
Agatha Christie's Poirot, Murder in the Mews (1989) – Jane Plenderleith
Crossing to Freedom (1990) – Mademoiselle Tenois
Rumpole of the Bailey (episode Rumpole and the Eternal Triangle, 1992) – Hilary Peek Q.C.
Absolutely Fabulous (episode France, 1992) – Air Hostess
All or Nothing at All (1993) – Kilpatrick
The Chief (1993–1994) – Marie-Pierre Arnoux
Salut Serge (1997) - Pascal

References

External links

1964 births
Living people
English film actresses
English television actresses
English stage actresses
Actresses from London
Trompe-l'œil artists